Henri Rust (1906–1996) was a Dutch-born film editor who worked in several countries, notably France.

Selected filmography

References

Bibliography 
 Capua, Michelangelo. Anatole Litvak: The Life and Films. McFarland, 2015.

External links 
 

1906 births
1996 deaths
Dutch film editors
French film editors
Dutch emigrants to France
People from Laren, North Holland